The Texas Lone Star Cup is given by the University Interscholastic League (UIL) and is based on a school district’s combined academic and athletic achievements.  All UIL member high schools in good academic and athletic eligibility standing will be included for contention.

What the UIL recognizes

This annual program recognizes five high schools, one in each of the six UIL classifications (6A, 5A, 4A, 3A, 2A, and 1A), based on their overall team achievement in sanctioned UIL Athletic/Academic championships.  As of January 1st, 2023 this included:

Team Sports
Boys' Baseball, Basketball, Football, and Soccer
Girls' Basketball, Soccer, Softball, and Volleyball
Tennis

Individual Sports
Boys' Cross Country, Golf, Track and Field, Swimming & Diving, Tennis, and Wrestling
Girls' Cross Country, Golf, Track and Field, Swimming & Diving, Tennis, and Wrestling

Non-Athletic Competitions
Academic events included in the State Academic Meet
Congress
Film
Marching Band
Mariachi
One-Act Play
Robotics (FIRST and BEST)
Spirit
Theatrical Design

Points and Standings

Standings for the Lone Star Cup are compiled via a year-long accumulation of points based on team success at the district and state level in the UIL activities listed above.

Rankings in state or national polls do not count in Lone Star Cup standings.

Lone Star Cup points are accrued as follows:

Athletic Contests

Team Sports
Regular Season: District Championship and Play-off Berth—4
Regular Season: Play-off Berth Only—2
Playoffs: Each Victory or Advancement via Bye or Forfeit—2

Overall Team Standings in Individual Sports (State Meet only, not including Team Tennis)
First Place—10
Second Place—8
Third Place—6
Fourth Place—4
Fifth Place—2

Team Tennis (State Meet only)
State Championship—10
State Runner-up—8
State Semifinalist—5

Academic Competitions

Overall Team Standings in One Act Play (State Meet only)
First Place—10
Second Place—8
Third Place—6

Academic Events
District Championship—4
Regional Championship—4
Overall Team Standings in State Meet:
First Place—10
Second Place—8
Third Place—6
Fourth Place—4
Fifth Place—2

Music Competitions

Marching Band
Area Championship—4
Overall Standings in State Meet:
First Place—10
Second Place—8
Third Place—6
Fourth Place—4
Fifth Place—2

In the event of a team championship tie (common in academic events) or a tie in the final standings for the individual sports and academic competitions, the schools will split the allotted points of that place and the place immediately following.
Example: A two-way tie for third in the Boys' Cross Country competition would result in 10 points (6 points for third place plus 4 points for fourth place) being split between the two teams; thus, each team would receive five points.

Official Tie Breakers
If two schools in the same classification finish the UIL athletic/academic year tied atop the Lone Star Cup point standings, the overall winner will be determined as follows:

First tiebreaker—most overall state championships in all activities included in the Lone Star Cup program
Second tiebreaker—most total points received at the State Academic Meet
Third tiebreaker—most district championships in team sports included in the Lone Star Cup program

Prior Lone Star Cup Champions
The award began with the 1997–98 school year.

References

External links
 The UIL's Lone Star Cup Media Information Page

University Interscholastic League